The 2014 4 Nations Cup was a women's ice hockey tournament held in Kamloops, British Columbia, Canada. It was the nineteenth edition of the 4 Nations Cup.

News
October 16: Ten of the players named to the Canadian roster shall be making their debut with the Canadian national women's team. The ten players include: Erin Ambrose, Jessica Campbell, Emily Clark, Erica Howe, Halli Krzyzaniak, Emerance Maschmeyer, Jamie Lee Rattray, Jillian Saulnier, Kelly Terry and Blayre Turnbull.

Results

Preliminary round

All times are local (UTC−8).

Bronze medal game

Gold medal game

Statistics

Final standings

Scoring leaders
Only the top ten skaters, sorted by points, then goals, are included in this list.

GP = Games played; G = Goals; A = Assists; Pts = Points; PIM = Penalties in minutes; POS = Position
Source: Hockey Canada

Goaltending leaders
Only the top five goaltenders, based on save percentage, who have played at least 40% of their team's minutes, are included in this list.

TOI = Time on Ice (minutes:seconds); SA = Shots against; GA = Goals against; GAA = Goals against average; Sv% = Save percentage; SO = Shutouts
Source: Hockey Canada

References

External links
Official website

2014–15
2014–15 in Finnish ice hockey
2014–15 in Swedish ice hockey
2014–15 in Canadian women's ice hockey
2014–15 in American women's ice hockey
2014–15 in women's ice hockey
2014–15
Ice hockey in British Columbia
Sport in Kamloops
Sports competitions in British Columbia